Gmina Biała Podlaska is a rural gmina (administrative district) in Biała Podlaska County, Lublin Voivodeship, in eastern Poland. Its seat is the city of Biała Podlaska, although the city is not part of the territory of the gmina.

Villages
Gmina Biała Podlaska contains the villages and settlements of Cełujki, Cicibór Duży, Cicibór Mały, Czosnówka, Dokudów Drugi, Dokudów Pierwszy, Grabanów, Grabanów-Kolonia, Hola, Hrud, Husinka, Janówka, Jaźwiny, Julków, Kaliłów, Kamieniczne, Krzymowskie, Lisy, Łukowce, Michałówka, Młyniec, Nowy Sławacinek, Ogrodniki, Ortel Książęcy Drugi, Ortel Książęcy Pierwszy, Perkowice, Pojelce, Pólko, Porosiuki, Rakowiska, Roskosz, Sitnik, Stary Sławacinek, Styrzyniec, Surmacze, Swory, Sycyna, Terebela, Wilczyn, Wólka Plebańska, Woroniec, Woskrzenice Duże, Woskrzenice Małe, Zabłocie and Zacisze.

Neighbouring gminas
Gmina Biała Podlaska is bordered by the city of Biała Podlaska and by the gminas of Drelów, Huszlew, Janów Podlaski, Leśna Podlaska, Łomazy, Międzyrzec Podlaski, Piszczac, Rokitno and Zalesie.

References

External links
Polish official population figures 2006

Biala Podlaska
Biała Podlaska County